Clark Ridge is a prominent rock ridge,  long, located 4 nautical miles west of Mount Lowry in the Anderson Hills in the northern Patuxent Range, Pensacola Mountains. It was mapped by the United States Geological Survey from surveys and from U.S. Navy air photos, 1956–66.  It was named by the Advisory Committee on Antarctic Names for Larry Clark, cook at Plateau Station, winter 1967.

References 

Ridges of Queen Elizabeth Land